The All-China Youth Federation (ACYF) is a people's organization founded on 4 May 1949 that represents many youth groups in China, including the Communist Youth League of China. Former paramount leaders and General Secretaries of the Chinese Communist Party Hu Jintao and Jiang Zemin were both members.

Tasks
According to its official website, the basic tasks of All-China Youth Federation are:

Hold aloft the banners of patriotism and socialism
Encourage young people to study Marxism–Leninism, Mao Zedong Thought and Deng Xiaoping Theory and to study the socialist market economy, modern science and technology and general knowledge
Extensively represent and safeguard the legitimate rights and interests of young people of all ethnic groups and all walks of life
Guide young people to actively participate in social activities and work hard to help them develop healthily and become well-trained
Actively develop ties of friendship with young people of Taiwan, Hong Kong and Macao and overseas Chinese
Consolidate and develop the situation of social stability and unity in China, promote its socialist modernization drive, push the development of the socialist market economy, improve the socialist democracy and legal system and promote the reunification of the motherland and defend the peace and development of the whole world.

References

External links
 All China Youth Federation official website

Youth organizations based in China
Youth organizations established in 1949

Organizations associated with the Chinese Communist Party
Communist Youth League of China